is a Japanese actor and voice actor from Tokyo, Japan.

Filmography

Television animation
Major (2004), Joe Gibson
Yu-Gi-Oh! GX (2004), Kabukid
Viewtiful Joe (2004), Whity
One Piece (2004), Dr. Honner
Eyeshield 21 (2005), Natsuhiko Taki
Gallery Fake (2005), Simon
Blue Dragon (2007), Minotaur
Stitch! (2008), Reuben
Zettai Karen Children (2008), Shirō Magi
Yu-Gi-Oh! 5D's (2008), Tetsu Trudge
Naruto: Shippuden (2011), Iggy
Jormungand (2012), C.K. Kloskin
Kingdom (2013), Amon
Chaika - The Coffin Princess (2014), Marat
Yuri on Ice (2016), Celestino Chaldini
Carole & Tuesday (2019), Benito

Original net animation (ONA)
Kotaro Lives Alone (2022), Ohba

Original video animation (OVA)
Lupin III: Return of the Magician (2002), a sommelier
Mobile Suit Gundam: The Origin (2017), the mayor of Granada

Theatrical animation
Major: The ball of Friendship (2008), Joe Gibson

Tokusatsu
Seijuu Sentai Gingaman (1998), Black Knight BullBlack
Kamen Rider Den-O (2007), Tortoise Imagin (ep. 21 - 22), Panda Rabbit Imagin (ep. 39)

Video games
Sonic Adventure 2 (2001), GUN soldiers
Glass Rose (2003), Jungo Ogasawara
Yu-Gi-Oh! series (2009–), Tetsu Ushio
Metal Gear Solid: Peace Walker (2010), a Soldier
Ni no Kuni: Wrath of the White Witch (2011), Apus
Time Travelers (2012), Morito Takaido
Final Fantasy XV (2016), Petra Fortis
Resident Evil 7: Biohazard (2017), Peter Walken
Kingdom Hearts III (2019), Aliens
Yakuza: Like A Dragon (2020), Toshio Arakawa
 Famicom Detective Club: The Girl Who Stands Behind (2021 Remake) (2021), Inspector Maruyama

Dubbing

Live-action
1%, President Knuck (Matthew Nable)
10,000 BC, Nakudu (Joel Virgel)
42, Leo Durocher (Christopher Meloni)
The Adventures of Elmo in Grouchland, Elmo
The Affair of the Necklace, Rétaux de Villette (Simon Baker)
Alice Through the Looking Glass, Delivery Frog
Anchorman: The Legend of Ron Burgundy, Brian Fantana (Paul Rudd)
Annapolis, Jake Huard (James Franco)
Annika, DS Michael McAndrews (Jamie Sives)
Army of the Dead, Martin (Garrett Hedlund)
Back to the Future Part II (2018 BS Japan edition), Douglas J. Needles (Flea)
Bad Lieutenant: Port of Call New Orleans, Stevie Pruit (Val Kilmer)
Baggage Claim, Langston Jefferson Battle III (Taye Diggs)
Battleship, Cal Zapata (Hamish Linklater)
The Big Bang Theory, Barry Kripke (John Ross Bowie)
Black Mass, John Connolly (Joel Edgerton)
Boardwalk Empire, Al Capone (Stephen Graham)
Braqueurs, Yanis Zeri (Sami Bouajila)
Bring It On: All or Nothing, Jesse (Gus Carr)
Brooklyn's Finest, Detective Clarence "Tango" Butler (Don Cheadle)
Bullitt (2015 Wowow edition), Lt. Frank Bullitt (Steve McQueen)
The Child in Time, Charles (Stephen Campbell Moore)
Constantine, Papa Midnite (Djimon Hounsou)
Cuban Fury, Drew (Chris O'Dowd)
Curse of Chucky, Ian (Brennan Elliott)
Delivery Man, Brett (Chris Pratt)
The Dictator,  Aladeen / Efawadh (Sacha Baron Cohen)
A Dog's Purpose, Carlos Ruiz (John Ortiz)
Drive Hard, Peter Roberts (Thomas Jane)
Firewall (2009 TV Asahi edition), Liam (Nikolaj Coster-Waldau)
First Sunday, Ricky (Katt Williams)
G.I. Joe: The Rise of Cobra, Wallace Weems / Ripcord (Marlon Wayans)
Glitter, Julian "Dice" Black (Max Beesley)
Gone, Sgt. Powers (Daniel Sunjata)
Gossip Girl, Carter Baizen (Sebastian Stan)
Great Expectations, Finnegan "Finn" Bell (Ethan Hawke)
Half Past Dead, Twitch (Kurupt)
He's Just Not That Into You, Conor Barry (Kevin Connolly)
Home Alone: The Holiday Heist, Hughes (Eddie Steeples)
The Huntsman: Winter's War, Gryff (Rob Brydon)
In Her Shoes, Simon Stein (Mark Feuerstein)
Infinitely Polar Bear, Cam Stuart (Mark Ruffalo)
Kangaroo Jack, Charlie Carbone (Jerry O'Connell)
Lethal Weapon 2 (1993 TV Asahi edition), Arjen Rudd (Joss Ackland)
The Lost Daughter, Professor Hardy (Peter Sarsgaard)
Mad Max: Fury Road, The Ace (Jon Iles)
Mad Max: Fury Road (2019 THE CINEMA edition), Corpus Colossus (Quentin Kenihan)
The Magnificent Seven, Bartholomew Bogue (Peter Sarsgaard)
Mary Poppins Returns, Parrot Umbrella (Edward Hibbert)
Mercenary for Justice, Samuel (Michael K. Williams)
A Million Ways to Die in the West, Edward (Giovanni Ribisi)
Nacho Libre, Steven / Esqueleto (Héctor Jiménez)
Nebraska, David Grant (Will Forte)
Not Safe for Work, Roger Crawford (Tom Gallop)
Old Dogs, Craig White (Seth Green)
Old School, Bernard "Beanie" Campbell (Vince Vaughn)
The Onion Movie, White Trash Dude (Steven Kozlowski)
A Perfect Getaway, Cliff (Steve Zahn)
Pirates of the Caribbean: On Stranger Tides, Salaman (Paul Bazely)
Platoon (1998 DVD edition), Bunny (Kevin Dillon)
Police, Jailbird and Thief (Wesley Ruggles)
Project ALF, Captain Dr. Rick Mullican (William O'Leary)
Prometheus, Millburn (Rafe Spall)
Prometheus (2017 The Cinema edition), Fifield (Sean Harris)
Rise of the Planet of the Apes, Steven Jacobs (David Oyelowo)
The Sandlot: Heading Home, Benny Rodriguez (Danny Nucci)
A Series of Unfortunate Events, Uncle Monty (Aasif Mandvi)
Some Like It Hot (2012 Wowow edition), Joe (Tony Curtis)
Species III, Dean (Robin Dunne)
Ted, Donny (Giovanni Ribisi)
Ted 2, Donny (Giovanni Ribisi)
The Tramp (2014 Star Channel edition), Edna's Fiancé / Second Thief (Lloyd Bacon)
Transformers: Revenge of the Fallen, Wheelie (Tom Kenny)
Transformers: Dark of the Moon, Wheelie (Tom Kenny)
Transformers: The Last Knight, Wheelie (Tom Kenny)
Tully, Drew Moreau (Ron Livingston)
Wrath of the Titans, Agenor (Toby Kebbell)
XXX: State of the Union, Darius Stone (Ice Cube)
You, Me and Dupree, Randolph "Randy" Dupree (Owen Wilson)
You Stupid Man, Owen (David Krumholtz)

Animation
The Angry Birds Movie, Ross and Cyrus
Cars 2, Miles Axelrod
Chip 'n Dale: Rescue Rangers, Sweet Pete
The Good Dinosaur, Thunderclap
Inside Out, Fear
The Lego Movie 2: The Second Part, Banarnar, Balthazar
Luca, Uncle Ugo
Moominvalley, Sniff
Regular Show, Mordecai
Storks, Henry Gardner
Wreck-It Ralph, Mayor Gene
Ralph Breaks the Internet, Mayor Gene

References
 Official agency profile

External links

1966 births
Living people
Japanese male stage actors
Japanese male video game actors
Japanese male voice actors
Male voice actors from Tokyo
20th-century Japanese male actors
21st-century Japanese male actors